The James W. Townsend House is a U.S. historic home in Lake Butler, Florida. It is located at 235 Southwest 4th Avenue, south of SR 100. On February 29, 1996, it was added to the U.S. National Register of Historic Places.

See also
 Townsend Building, also in Butler

References

External links
 

Houses on the National Register of Historic Places in Florida
Houses in Union County, Florida
National Register of Historic Places in Union County, Florida